is a newscaster in Japan, a former TBS announcer.

Appearance program
Evening 5 / JNN Evening News

References

1954 births
Living people
Japanese announcers
People from Shibuya
People from Yokohama